The 1996 Kaspiysk bombing occurred on 16 November 1996 when Chechen terrorists bombed an apartment building in Kaspiysk, Dagestan, killing 68 people.

The bombing destroyed a nine-story apartment. 68 people died, including 21 children. The target of the explosion is suspected to be against Russian Border Guard officers who were living inside with their families.

Boris Yeltsin declared a national day of mourning in response to the attack.

See also 

 2002 Kaspiysk bombing
 Russian apartment bombings

References 

1996 murders in Europe
20th-century mass murder in Russia
History of Dagestan
Kaspiysk
Improvised explosive device bombings in Russia
Islamic terrorist incidents in 1996
Mass murder in 1996
November 1996 crimes
November 1996 events in Russia
Terrorist incidents in Russia in 1996
Building bombings in Russia